St. Arul Anandar School, Oriyur is a private Catholic secondary school located in Orur (sometimes spelled Oriyur), Tamil Nadu, India. Founded by the Jesuits in 1908, the school educates students from grade 6 through to grade 12. The medium of instruction is Tamil.

See also

 List of Jesuit schools
 List of schools in Tamil Nadu

References

Jesuit secondary schools in India
Christian schools in Tamil Nadu
High schools and secondary schools in Tamil Nadu
Tamil-language schools
Educational institutions established in 1908
1908 establishments in India